Debbie McLeod (born 20 October 1972 in Dundee) is a female field hockey goalkeeper from Scotland.  She played club hockey for Bonagrass Grove, and made her debut for the Women's National Team in 1999. McLeod works as a swimming pool technician. Her brother played national level football at U16 level.

References

1972 births
Living people
Scottish female field hockey players
Field hockey players at the 2002 Commonwealth Games
Field hockey players at the 2006 Commonwealth Games
Sportspeople from Dundee
Commonwealth Games competitors for Scotland